William Williams may refer to:

Art and literature
 William Williams (artist) (1727–1791), artist and author of American novel Penrose
 William Joseph Williams (1759–1823), artist who painted three presidents
 William Williams (antiquary) (Gwilym Ddu o Arfon, 1739–1817), Welsh historian and poet
 William Williams (Carw Coch) (1808–1872, bardic name Carw Coch), Welsh literary figure
 William Williams (Creuddynfab) (1814–1869), Welsh poet and literary critic
 William Williams (Crwys) (1875–1968, bardic name Crwys), Welsh-language poet
 William Carlos Williams (1883–1963), American poet
 William T. Williams (born 1942), New York painter

Military
 William Williams (printer and publisher) (1787–1850), printer, publisher and colonel during the War of 1812
 William Williams (soldier) (died 1814), soldier killed in defense of Fort McHenry during the War of 1812
 William Orton Williams (1839–1863), Confederate officer executed as a spy
 William Williams (Medal of Honor) (1840–1893), Medal of Honor recipient of the American Civil War
 William Haliday Williams (1845–1916), American Civil War soldier and Medal of Honor recipient
 William Charles Williams (1880–1915), Victoria Cross recipient of the First World War
 William Williams (VC) (1890–1965), Victoria Cross recipient of the First World War
 William Fenwick Williams (1800–1883), Canadian-born British military leader
 William Williams (naval officer), American naval officer in the American Revolution

Politics

U.S.
 William Williams (Connecticut politician) (1731–1811), US Continental Congressman
 William M. Williams (Texas politician) (1809–1859), politician in the Texas House and Senate
 William Williams (New York politician) (1815–1876), US Representative from New York
 William Williams (Indiana politician) (1821–1896), US Representative from Indiana
 William B. Williams (politician) (1826–1905), US Representative from Michigan
 William M. Williams Jr. (1846–?), member of the Wisconsin State Assembly
 William E. Williams (1857–1921), U.S. Representative from Illinois
 William R. Williams (1884–1972), US Representative from the state of New York
 William Reid Williams (1866–1931), United States Assistant Secretary of War
 William Williams (surgeon) (1856–1919), Surgeon General
 William Williams (commissioner) (1862–1947), Commissioner of Immigration, Ellis Island
 William R. Williams (California politician), California State Treasurer, 1907–1911

UK
 Sir William Williams, 6th Baronet (died 1696), Welsh politician
 Sir William Williams, 1st Baronet, of Gray's Inn (1634–1700), Welsh lawyer and politician, speaker of the House of Commons
 Sir William Williams, 2nd Baronet, of Gray's Inn (1665–1740), Welsh politician, Member of Parliament (MP) for Denbigh, 1708–1710
 William Peere Williams (1664–1736), MP for Bishop's Castle, 1722–1727
 Sir William Williams, 2nd Baronet, of Clapton (1730–1761), MP for New Shoreham, 1758–1751
 William Addams Williams (1787–1861), British Member of Parliament for Monmouthshire
 William Williams (Radical politician) (1788–1865), Welsh businessman based in London, Radical MP 1835–1847 and 1850–1865
 William Williams (Swansea MP) (1840–1904), British Member of Parliament for Swansea District 1893–1895
 William Williams (Labour politician) (1895–1963), British civil servant and politician
 Thomas Williams (Warrington MP) (William Thomas Williams, 1915–1986), British Member of Parliament for Warrington
 William Williams (Weymouth MP) (1774–1839), British Member of Parliament for Weymouth and Melcombe Regis
 W. Llewelyn Williams (1867–1922), Welsh journalist, lawyer and Liberal Party politician

Other countries
 William Williams (New South Wales politician) (1856–1947), member of the New South Wales Legislative Assembly
 William Williams (Tasmanian politician) (1851–1924), member of the Tasmanian Legislative Council

Religion
 William Williams (Archdeacon of Cashel) (fl. 17th century), Irish Anglican clergyman
 William Williams of Wern (1781–1840), Welsh Independent minister, promoter of the General Union movement of 1834
 William Williams (bishop) (1800–1878), bishop of Waiapu in New Zealand
 William Williams (Caledfryn) (1801–1869), Welsh Congregational minister, poet and literary critic
 Leonard Williams (bishop) (William Leonard Williams, 1829–1916), third bishop of Waiapu in New Zealand
 William Augustine Williams, African-American linguist, librarian, Catholic seminarian, and public figure
 William Williams (priest) (1848–1930), Dean of St David's, 1919–1931
 William Williams (minister) (1848–1913), Australian Methodist minister and president-general of the Methodist Church of Australasia 1907–1910
 William A. Williams (creationist) (1854–1938), American Presbyterian clergyman and creationist writer
 William Williams (missionary) (1859–1892), Welsh missionary to East Khasi Hills, India
 William Richard Williams (theologian) (1896–1962), theologian and principal of the United Theological College Aberystwyth

Sports

Football and rugby
 William Williams (footballer, born 1856) (1856–?), Welsh international footballer in the 1870s and 1880s
 William Williams (footballer, born 1892) (1892–1926), English footballer
 William Williams (rugby union) (1866–1945), Welsh rugby union footballer in the 1880s and 1890s
 William Henry Williams (rugby union) (1873–1936), Welsh rugby union footballer who played in the 1900s for Wales, Pontymister RFC, and London Welsh RFC
 Billy Williams (rugby, born 1925) (1925–2007), Welsh rugby union and rugby league footballer in the 1940s
 William Williams (Halifax RLFC) (20th century), Welsh rugby league footballer in the 1900s and 1910s
 William M. Williams (American football) (1877–1932), head coach of the Clemson college football program in 1897
 J. William Williams (1880–1908), American football player and coach
 John Williams (footballer, born 1960) (William John Williams), English footballer

Other sports
 William Williams (baseball) (1916–2009), co-owner of the Cincinnati Reds baseball team
 William Williams (cricketer, born 1844) (1844–1885), English cricketer
 Will Williams (born 1992), New Zealand cricketer

Other
 William Williams Pantycelyn (1717–1791), Welsh composer of hymns
 William S. Williams (1787–1849), mountain man and frontiersman
 William S. Williams, travelled to South Australia on the Cygnet in the First Fleet of South Australia in 1836
 William Mattieu Williams (1820–1892), English writer on science
 William Williams (veterinary surgeon) (1832–1900), Welsh veterinary surgeon
 William Owen Williams (1860–1911), British veterinarian
 William Aubrey Williams (1834–1891), bardic name Gwilym Gwent), Welsh composer
 William Muir Williams, judge of the Supreme Court of Missouri in 1898
 William Henry Williams (1852–1941), English-born Australian headmaster and professor
 William Williams (doctor) (1855/6–1911), Welsh doctor and writer on sanitation issues
 William Williams (murderer) (1877–1906), last person executed by Minnesota
 William M. Williams, US Commissioner of Internal Revenue 1920–1921
 William Emrys Williams (1896–1977), British educationalist and editor-in-chief of Penguin Books
 William Williams (surveyor) (1901–1995), British academic at Cambridge
 William H. Williams (1910–1999), British production manager and producer
 W. T. Williams (William Thomas Williams, 1913–1995), English and Australian botanist and plant taxonomist
 William Appleman Williams (1921–1990), American historian
 William B. Williams (DJ) (1923–1986), disc jockey on New York City radio station WNEW
 William Williams (metallurgist) (1927–2011), Canadian metallurgical engineer
 William T. B. Williams, dean at the Tuskegee Institute
 William Williams (brewer), settler and brewer in the Province of South Australia
 William Morgan Williams, presenter of a 1969 Frazer Lecture
 William Williams, character in 2006 film American Dreamz

See also
 Sir William Williams (disambiguation)
 Sir William Williams, 1st Baronet (disambiguation)
 William J. Williams (disambiguation)
 William Peere Williams (disambiguation)
 William Thomas Williams (disambiguation)
 Willie Williams (disambiguation)
 Bill Williams (disambiguation)
 Billy Williams (disambiguation)